XHFAC-FM is a radio station on 92.9 FM in Salvatierra, Guanajuato. XHFAC is owned by Radiorama, carrying its Fiesta Mexicana regional Mexican format.

History
XHFAC began as XEFAC-AM. The station, named for original concessionaire Felipe Arizaga Castillo, received its concession on April 1, 1970 and operated as a daytimer on 1380 kHz. In the 1980s, it moved to 1290 in order to begin nighttime service and increase its daytime power to 5 kW.

In 2012, XEFAC was cleared to migrate to FM on 92.9 MHz. In 2015, it also applied to build an emergency transmitter at its site in Salvatierra.

On March 9, 2020, XHFAC-FM became part of Multimedios Radio with the La Lupe grupera format.

References

Radio stations in Guanajuato
Radio stations established in 1970